Anton Sinapov (born 1 September 1993) is a Bulgarian biathlete, who started his career as a cross-country skier.

Career
Sinapov participated at the 2011 Nordic World Ski Championships, where he finished 87th in the sprint.

Sinapov competed at the Biathlon World Championships in 2015, 2016 and 2017. His best individual result was the 11th place in the sprint in 2017 and the best relay results were the two 8th places, achieved in 2016/17 and 2017/18 seasons. In 2016/17 he had his highest overall result in the World Cup with a 70th place at the end of the season.

He competed in the 2018 Winter Olympics and finished 56th in the sprint, 60th in the pursuit, 71st in the individual and was part of the lapped relay.

Biathlon results
All results are sourced from the International Biathlon Union.

World Championships
0 medals

*During Olympic seasons competitions are only held for those events not included in the Olympic program.
**The single mixed relay was added as an event in 2019.

References

1993 births
Living people
Bulgarian male cross-country skiers
Biathletes at the 2018 Winter Olympics
Biathletes at the 2022 Winter Olympics
Bulgarian male biathletes
Olympic biathletes of Bulgaria
People from Smolyan
20th-century Bulgarian people
21st-century Bulgarian people